Ctenuchidia butus is a moth of the subfamily Arctiinae. It was described by Johan Christian Fabricius in 1787. It is found in South America.

References

Arctiinae
Moths described in 1787